Kbela, is a 2015 Brazilian short film directed by Yasmin Thayna. The film focused on racism that permeates the lives of black women in Brazil.

The film received positive reviews and won several awards at international film festivals. The film was released in The Netherlands on 24 January 2019 at International Film Festival Rotterdam. On 28 October 2019, it was released at North Carolina Latin American Film Festival, USA. In 2017, the film received the Best African Diaspora Short Film Award from the Africa Movie Academy Awards (AMAA).

Cast
 Monique Rocco
 Isabél Zuaa

References

External links
 
 Kbela on YouTube

2015 films
2015 short films
Brazilian short films